Gary Eccles is a former association football player who represented New Zealand at international level.

Eccles made a solitary official international appearance for New Zealand in a 4–2 win over New Caledonia on 4 June 1962.

References 

Year of birth missing (living people)
Living people
New Zealand association footballers
New Zealand international footballers
Association footballers not categorized by position